William Hare, 2nd Earl of Listowel  (22 September 1801 – 4 February 1856), known as Viscount Ennismore from 1827 to 1837, was an Anglo-Irish peer and Member of Parliament (MP).

Life
Listowel was the eldest son of Richard Hare, Viscount Ennismore, and Catherine Bridget Dillon. William Hare, 1st Earl of Listowel, was his grandfather. He was elected Whig MP for Kerry in 1826, a seat he held until 1830.  He was appointed High Sheriff of County Cork for 1834. In 1837 he succeeded his grandfather in the earldom but as this was an Irish peerage it did not entitle him to a seat in the House of Lords.   During Melbourne's Whig ministry he served as Vice-Admiral of Munster and was made a Knight of the Order of St Patrick in 1839.  Listowel instead returned to the House of Commons in 1841 when he was elected Whig MP for St Albans, a constituency he represented until 1846.  In latter part of his career he served the Whig government of Lord John Russell in the House of Lords as a Lord-in-Waiting to HM Queen Victoria, in which office he continued under Peelite Lord Aberdeen.

Lord Listowel married Maria Augusta Windham, daughter of Vice-Admiral William Lukin Windham, on 23 July 1831.  He died in February 1856, aged 54, and was succeeded in his titles by his eldest son William Hare, 3rd Earl of Listowel.  Lady Listowel died in 1871.

Augusta Maria (1832-1881) married 4th Earl of Carysfort
William, 3rd Earl of Listowel (1833-1924)
Emily Catherine (1834-1916) married Sir John Wrixon-Becher
Sophia Eliza (1835-1912)
Richard, Rear-Admiral (1836–1903)
Ralph, Major RHA (1838–1879)
Hugh Henry, Lt Bengal SC (1839–1927) married Georgiana Caroline, third daughter of Colonel Birnie Browne, Bengal Artillery.
Victoria Alexandrina (1840-1927) married 3rd Earl of Yarborough, and secondly, John M Richardson of Edmundthorpe Hall.
Edward Charles (1842-4)
Adela Maria (1845-1912), twin of Eleanor Cecilia, married Colonel Cuthbert Larking (d.1910) of 15th Hussars
Eleanor Cecilia (1845-1924), twin of Adela Maria, married 1st Baron Heneage, PC (d.1922)

Notes

Bibliography
Kidd, Charles, Williamson, David (eds.) Debrett's Peerage and Baronetage London and New York: St Martin's Press, 1990.
Charles Mosley, Burke's Peerage and Baronetage, (106th edition, 1999), vol.1, p. 1735
Charles Mosley, Burke's Peerage and Baronetage, (107th edition, 2003), vol.2, p. 2365

External links 

 

1801 births
1856 deaths
Knights of St Patrick
Hare, William
Hare, William
Hare, William
Hare, William
UK MPs who inherited peerages
High Sheriffs of County Cork
2
William